Wesley Lau (June 18, 1921August 30, 1984) was an American film and television actor, and occasional screenwriter.

Early life
Wesley Lau was born and raised 
in Sheboygan, Wisconsin. His parents were Albert and Agnes ( Feldner) Lau. He graduated from Central High School in 1939.

A World War II veteran of the United States Army Air Forces, Lau studied playwriting at the University of Wisconsin and received a Master of Arts degree at Yale Drama School, later continuing his studies at The Actors Studio in New York.

He took time off from college at one point to serve in World War II as part of the air corps. Although his goal in life was to be a writer, he ended up acting simply because he found more jobs as an actor than as a playwright when he arrived in New York City seeking work.

Career
Lau was probably best known as Lt. Andy Anderson in the series Perry Mason.  He appeared frequently during the latter part of the show's run, especially during times when longtime series regular Ray Collins, who played Lt. Arthur Tragg, was absent. Collins died in 1965 before the series ended its run. Lau first appeared on Perry Mason as defendant Amory Fallon in "The Case of the Impatient Partner" in September 1961.  Less than a month later, he made the first of 81 appearances as Lt. Anderson, a role which ran from the fourth episode, "The Case of the Malicious Mariner" of the fifth season (1961–1962) through the last episode, "The Case of the Mischievous Doll" of the eighth season (1964–1965).

Other shows in which Lau made appearances include Alfred Hitchcock Presents, Gunsmoke, Mike Hammer, Johnny Ringo, Have Gun-Will Travel, Peter Gunn, The Twilight Zone, The Time Tunnel, The Big Valley, Mission: Impossible, Cannon, Wagon Train, and The Six Million Dollar Man. He would reunite with Raymond Burr in an episode of Ironside called "In the Forests of the Night".

He appeared in motion pictures including the John Wayne film The Alamo (1960).

Death
Lau died of heart failure on August 30, 1984, aged 63, and is buried at Forest Lawn-Hollywood Hills Cemetery, Los Angeles.

Acting roles

Television series

The Web, "A Time For Dying" (1953)
Studio One, "Crime at Blossom's" (1953)
Armstrong Circle Theatre, "Night Court" (1957), Mr. Miller
Omnibus, "Lee at Gettysburg" (1957), Maj. Gen. John B. Hood
Steve Canyon, "Operation Crash Landing" (1958), Sgt. Bowman
Lawman, "The Badge" (1958), Rick Andrews
Mickey Spillane's Mike Hammer, "Peace Bond" (1958), Johnny Conrad

Alfred Hitchcock Presents
"Mrs. Herman and Mrs. Fenimore" (1958), Police Detective
"And the Desert Shall Blossom" (1958), Tex, the Deputy

Flight
"The Dart" (1958)
"Destination Normandy" (1958)
"Typhoon Chasers" (1958)

Jane Wyman Presents
"He Came for the Money" (1958), Clay
"Day of Glory" (1958), Commander Von Schoss

The DuPont Show with June Allyson, "The Girl" (1959), Joseph Dunn
Pony Express, "The Peace Offering" (1959), Hager
Whirlybirds, "Mr. Jinx" (1959), James
Westinghouse Desilu Playhouse, "A Diamond for Carla" (1959), Jery Wilson
Goodyear Theatre, "Story Without a Moral" (1959), Captain Rheinhold
Peter Gunn
"Kill from Nowhere" (1959), Joe Scully
"The Death Frame" (1960),  Eddie Carson

Have Gun – Will Travel
"Sons of Aaron Murdock" (1959), Lew Murdock
"Saturday Night" (1960), Stub

Gunsmoke
"Miguel's Daughter" (1959), Ab
"Young Love" (1959), Rod Allison
"The Blacksmith" (1960), Willy

Black Saddle
"Client: Tagger" (1959), Jesse Britt
"Burden of Guilt" (1960), Trip Harris

Alcoa Presents: One Step Beyond
"The Haunted U-Boat" (1959), Lt. Schneider
"The Mask" (1960), Lt. Harold Wilenski

Michael Shayne, "Murder in Wonderland" (1960), Jerry Latimer
The Law and Mr. Jones, "Christmas Is a Legal Holiday" (1960), Roger Forester
The Untouchables, "Kiss of Death Girl" (1960), Whitey Barrows
The Life and Legend of Wyatt Earp, "He's My Brother" (1960), Dave Dray
Tales of Wells Fargo
"Leading Citizen" (1960), Morgan Bates
"The English Woman" (1960), Hank
Shotgun Slade, "Backtrack" (1960), Jeb
M Squad, "A Grenade for a Summer's Evening" (1960), Harry
Law of the Plainsman, "Stella" (1960), Staff Meeker
Johnny Ringo, "Uncertain Vengeance" (1960), Red Crale
The Detectives Starring Robert Taylor, "The Trap" (1960), Carl Ryan
Mr. Lucky, "The Two Million Dollar Window" (1960), Slate
Johnny Midnight, "An Old-Fashioned Frame" (1960), Connor
Adventures in Paradise, "Vendetta" (1961), Paul Moore
The Tall Man, "Ladies of the Town" (1961), Jason Cleary
Coronado 9, "But the Patient Died" (1961), Dr. David Travis
Wagon Train, "The Christopher Hale Story" (1961), Stevens
Outlaws, "The Bill Doolin Story" (1961), Sam Evans
Shirley Temple Theatre, "Rebel Gun" (1961), Sheriff Westram

The Twilight Zone
"The Fugitive" (1962), Man
"Twenty Two" (1961), Airline Agent

Perry Mason (1961–1965), Lt. Andy Anderson (69 episodes); S5Ep2 Amory Fallon (1 episode)
Combat!, "Soldier of Fortune" (1965), Lt. Meyer
The Big Valley, "Earthquake!" (1965), Ralph Snyder

Bonanza
"Desert Justice" (1960), Dave Walker
"Her Brother's Keeper" (1966), Carl Armory

The Time Tunnel
"End of the World" (1966), M/Sgt. Jiggs
"Revenge of the Gods" (1966), M/Sgt. Jiggs
"One Way to the Moon" (1966), M/Sgt. Jiggs
"Rendezvous with Yesterday" (1966), M/Sgt. Jiggs
"Chase Through Time" (1967), M/Sgt. Jiggs

Laredo
"The Calico Kid" (1966) Jacobus Carson
"The Seventh Day" (1967) Reverend Egan Thomas

Garrison's Gorillas, "Banker's Hours" (1967), Col. Karl Vogel
Run for Your Life, "A Choice of Evils" (1967), Phil Carson

The Virginian
"Nobody Said Hello" (1966), Matt McLain
"The Gentle Tamers" (1968), Hoyt
"Vengeance Trail" (1967), Sheriff Ben Morris

Land of the Giants, "The Creed" (1968), Policeman #1
Walt Disney's Wonderful World of Color, "The Mystery of Edward Sims" (1968), Mr. Parker

The Mod Squad
"Willie Poor Boy" (1969), Dr. Albee
"The Poisoned Mind" (1971), Dr. Maggio

Longstreet, "One in the Reality Column" (1971), Defense Attorney

Mission: Impossible
"Doomsday" (1969), Dr. Thorgen
"My Friend, My Enemy" (1970), Karl Maur
"The Field" (1971) (writer)
"Double Dead" (1972), Jim Thompson

Cannon
"Hear No Evil" (1972), Ray Norman
"Valley of the Damned" (1973), Lt. Harry Wharton

Ironside, "In the Forests of the Night" (1973), Thompkins
Chase, "Gang War" (1973)
The Magician
"Ovation for Murder" (1973), Captain Gottschalk
"The Illusion of the Curious Counterfeit: Part 2" (1974), Captain Gottschalk
"Shattered Image" (1974), Captain Gottschalk

The Six Million Dollar Man, "Lost Love" (1975), Emil
Jacqueline Susann's Valley of the Dolls (1981), Man with Dog (final film role)

Feature-length films

I Want to Live! (1958) - Henry L. Graham
The Alamo (1960) - Emil Sande
The Venetian Affair (1967) - Neill Carlson
Panic in the City (1968) - Police Lt. Brady
Journey to Shiloh (1968) - Col. Boykin
The Sweet Ride (1968) - Gene Bronson (uncredited)
Zabriskie Point (1970) - Company Executive (uncredited)
Skyjacked (1972) - Stanley Morris
Incident on a Dark Street (1973, TV Movie) - John Pine
Lepke (1975) - First Detective (also as a writer)

References

External links

1921 births
1984 deaths
American people of German descent
American male film actors
American male television actors
Male actors from Wisconsin
People from Sheboygan, Wisconsin
Burials at Forest Lawn Memorial Park (Hollywood Hills)
20th-century American male actors
United States Army Air Forces personnel of World War II